Harpalus laetus is a species of ground beetle in the subfamily Harpalinae. It was described by Reiche in 1843.

References

laetus
Beetles described in 1843